NGC 1404 is an elliptical galaxy in the Southern constellation Eridanus. It was discovered on November 28, 1837, by the astronomer John Herschel. Based on the tip of the red-giant branch distance indicator, it lies at a distance of approximately 60 million light-years from the Milky Way. It is one of the brightest members of the Fornax Cluster.

Characteristics

As usual with most elliptical galaxies, NGC 1404 is rich in globular clusters, with a population of them that has been estimated to be around 725; however it has been proposed it could have lost most of its globular clusters due to gravitational interactions with NGC 1399, the brightest galaxy of the Fornax Cluster.

Studies with the help of the X-ray telescope Chandra show too how ram-pressure stripping caused by the motion of NGC 1404 through Fornax' intracluster medium is stripping this galaxy of its hot gas, leaving behind a large trail.

Gallery

References

External links
 

Eridanus (constellation)
Fornax Cluster
Elliptical galaxies
1404
013433